Hala is an Arabic female given name meaning "the aura of light around the moon". It is a cognate of the Hebrew name Hila.

Notable people with the name include:

 Hala bint D'aij Al Khalifa, wife of Salman bin Hamad bin Isa Al Khalifa, Crown Prince of Bahrain
 Hala El Badry (born 1954), Egyptian journalist and novelist
 Hala Finley (born 2009), American actress
 Hala Gezah (born 1989), Libyan sprinter
 Hala Gorani (born 1970), French-American CNN reporter
 Hala Halim, Egyptian-American academic and translator
 Hala Hussein, third daughter of Saddam Hussein and his first wife Sajida Talfah
 Hala Jaber, Lebanese-British journalist
 Hala Misrati (born 1980), Libyan writer and journalist
 Hala Moddelmog (born 1956), president of Arby's Restaurant Group, Inc
 Hala Mohammad al-Nasser (born 1964), Syrian politician
 Hala Sedki (born 1961), Egyptian actress
 Hala Shiha (born 1979), Egyptian actress
 Hala Shukrallah, Egyptian politician

Arabic feminine given names